Suat Aşani (22 September 1916 – 22 April 1970) was a Turkish fencer. She competed in the women's individual foil event at the 1936 Summer Olympics. She and her colleague Halet Çambel were the first Turkish sportswomen to participate at the Olympics.

References

External links
 

1916 births
1970 deaths
Turkish female foil fencers
Olympic fencers of Turkey
Fencers at the 1936 Summer Olympics
20th-century Turkish sportswomen